Hollands Kroon is a municipality located in the Northwest Netherlands. It was created on 1 January 2012, as a merger of four municipalities: Anna Paulowna, Niedorp, Wieringen, and Wieringermeer.

Localities

Cities (places/areas with city rights):
Barsingerhorn
Stede Niedorp
Wieringen 
Winkel

Local government 
The municipal council of Hollands Kroon consists of 29 seats, which are divided as follows:

The executive board consists of Onafhankelijk Hollands Kroon, Senioren Hollands Kroon, GroenLinks, Partij van de Arbeid en D66

Notable people 

 Dirck Pietersz van Nierop (1540 in Nieuwe Niedorp – 1610) a Mennonite minister
 Dirck Rembrantsz van Nierop (1610 in Nieuwe Niedorp – 1682) cartographer, mathematician, surveyor, astronomer and teacher
 Elisabeth van der Woude (1657 in Nieuwe Niedorp – 1698) a Dutch traveller and author
 Hendrik van Borssum Buisman (1873 in Wieringen – 1951) painter
 Pieter Baas (born 1944 in Wieringermeer) a Dutch botanist
 Gerbrand Bakker (born 1962 in Wieringerwaard) a Dutch writer

Sport 

 Albertus Perk (1887 in Anna Paulowna – 1919) a Dutch fencer, competed in the individual épée event at the 1912 Summer Olympics
 Ard Schenk (born 1944 in Anna Paulowna) a former speed skater, silver medallist at the 1968 Winter Olympics and triple gold medallist at the 1972 Winter Olympics
 Henk Schenk (born 1945 in Wieringerwaard) an American former wrestler, competed in the 1968 and 1972 Summer Olympics
 Erik Heijblok (born 1977 in Den Oever, Wieringen) retired football goalkeeper. 
 Selma Borst (born 1983 in Wieringerwaard) a Dutch runner
 Kai Reus (born 1985 in Niedorp) a Dutch former professional road bicycle racer
 Jessy Kramer (born 1990 in Zijdewind) a Dutch handball player
 Marit Raaijmakers (born 1999 in Hippolytushoef) a Dutch racing cyclist

Gallery

References

External links

Official website

 
Municipalities of North Holland
Municipalities of the Netherlands established in 2012